is a Japanese professional shogi player ranked 7-dan.

Early life
Kōsuke Tamura was born on March 16, 1976, in Uozu, Toyama.

In November 1987, Tamura entered the Japan Shogi Association's apprentice school at the rank of 6-kyū as a protegee of shogi professional Nobuyuki Ōuchi. He was promoted to 1-dan in 1991, and then obtained full professional status and the rank of 4-dan in October 1995.

Promotion history
The promotion history for Tamura is as follows:
 6-kyū: 1987
 1-dan: 1991
 4-dan: October 1, 1995
 5-dan: September 8, 2000
 6-dan: June 8, 2005
 7-dan: March 4, 203

Titles and other championships

Awards and honors
Tamura received the Japan Shogi Association Annual Shogi Award for "Best New Player" for the 20034 shogi year.

References

External links
ShogiHub: Professional Player Info · Tamura, Kosuke

Japanese shogi players
Living people
Professional shogi players
Professional shogi players from Toyama Prefecture
People from Uozu, Toyama
1976 births
Shinjin-Ō